Parvatas Kingdom refers to the territory of a tribe known as Parvatas (Mountaineers), mentioned in the epic Mahabharata. Most of the descriptions of Parvata kingdom in the epic refer to a mountainous country in the Himalayas. Tribes belonging to other mountainous regions in the north west, west and the east of the Indo-Gangetic Plain were also known as Parvatas, when used as a collective name. Parvatas took part in the Kurukshetra War. The epic also mentions a sage named Parvata who was a companion of sage Narada.

References in Mahabharata

Conquests of Vasudeva Krishna 
Parvatas were mentioned in the list of tribes conquered by Krishna:-
 
The Avantis, the Southerners, the Parvatas, the Daserakas, the Kasmirakas, the Aurasikas, the Pisachas, the Samudgalas, the Kamvojas, the Vatadhanas, the Cholas, the Pandyas, the Trigartas, the Malavas, the Daradas difficult of being vanquished, the Khasas arrived from diverse realms, as also the Sakas, and the Yavanas with followers, were all vanquished by Vasudeva Krishna (7:11)

In Kurukshtra War 
Parvatas took part in the Kurukshetra War siding with Kauravas.

In the back of the Garuda military formation made by Drona were the Kalingas, the Amvashthas, the Magadhas, the Paundras, the Madrakas, the Gandharas, the Sakunas, the Easterners, the Parvatas, and the Vasatis. (7:20)

Arjuna dispatched, the Yaudheyas, the Parvatas, the Madrakas, and the Malavas to the regions of the dead (7:158). The Tusharas, the Yavanas, the Khasas, the Darvabhisaras, the Daradas, the Sakas, the Kamathas, the Ramathas, the Tanganas the Andhrakas, the Pulindas, the Kiratas of fierce prowess, the Mlecchas, the Parvatas, and the races hailing from the sea-side, these all are united with the Kurus and fighting wrathfully for Duryodhana’s sake (8:73). All the Samsaptakas, the Kambojas together with the Sakas, the Mlecchas, the Parvatas, and the Yavanas, have been slain. (9:1)

Tribes mentioned by Karna 
Parvatas were mentioned in the conversation of Karna and Shalya. This conversation mentions about various cultures of ancient India, with a bias towards the Vedic culture prevailed in Kuru-Panchalas

The Magadhas are comprehenders of signs; the Koshalas comprehend from what they see; the Kurus and the Pancalas comprehend from a half-uttered speech; the Salwas cannot comprehend till the whole speech is uttered. The Parvatas, like the Sivis, are very stupid. The Yavanas are omniscient; the Suras are particularly so. The mlecchas are wedded to the creations of their own fancy other peoples cannot understand. The Vahikas resent beneficial counsels.  The Madrakas are regarded on Earth as the dirt of every nation. (8:45)

Sage named Parvata 
There was a sage named Parvata who was the companion of sage Narada, mentioned in Mahabharata and the Puranas. Both Parvata and Narada were travellers, during pre historic ages. They visited Kingdoms of Ancient India as well as other kingdoms beyond the Himalayas in Central Asia, China and West Asia. The name Parvata (meaning mountain in Sanskrit), was given to the traveller, probably because, the Vedic people saw them coming to them, after crossing the Himalaya mountains. The wife of Lord Siva, was named Parvati. The name suggests that she belonged to the tribe of Parvatas.

See also 
Kingdoms of Ancient India
Himalaya Kingdom
Kirata Kingdom

References 
Mahabharata of Krishna Dwaipayana Vyasa, translated to English by Kisari Mohan Ganguli

External links

Kingdoms in the Mahabharata
Himalayan kingdoms (Puranas)